Paudie O'Sullivan (born 28 November 1988) is an Irish hurler who plays for Cork Premier  Championship club Cloyne and Cork Senior Championship division Imokilly. He usually plays as a full-forward. O'Sullivan is a former member of the Cork senior hurling team.

O'Sullivan's brother, Diarmuid, is a three-time All-Ireland medalist with Cork, while his father, Jerry, has filled a number of important administrative roles with the Cork County Board and the Munster Council.

Playing career

Midleton CBS

O'Sullivan played in all grades of hurling with Midleton CBS Secondary School before progressing onto the college's senior team. On 12 March 2006, he scored a point from centre-back when Midelton CBS defeated St Flannan's College from Ennis by 2-08 to 0-12 to win the Harty Cup.

Cloyne

O'Sullivan plays his club hurling and Gaelic football with Cloyne.

In 2004 he was just fifteen years-old when he made his debut with the club's senior team. The following three years proved difficult for Cloyne as the club became the first team in over sixty years to lose three successive senior championship deciders. In spite of these defeats O'Sullivan was regularly one of the top scorers in the championship.

After capturing three successive divisional junior football championship medals between 2008 and 2010, O'Sullivan's side reached the county decider at the third attempt. A narrow 0-10 to 0-9 defeat of White's Cross gave him a championship medal.

Imokilly

O' Sullivan also played with the Imokilly division. He won Cork Senior Hurling Championship titles in  2017, 2018, 2019.

Cork

Minor and under-21

O'Sullivan was sixteen-years-old when he first played for Cork as a member of the minor team on 1 April 2005. He scored two goals on his debut in a 4-28 to 0-01 Munster Championship defeat of Kerry. O'Sullivan was later switched from the forwards to centre-back and won a Munster Championship medal on 26 June after a 2-18 to 1-12 defeat of Limerick in the final.

On 25 June 2006, O'Sullivan scored a point from left wing-back when Cork defeated Tipperary by 2-20 to 1-15 to win a second successive Munster Championship title.

O'Sullivan subsequently progressed onto the Cork under-21 team. He made his first appearance on 20 July 2008 in a 1-20 to 1-11 defeat by Clare in the Munster Championship. His tenure in the under-21 grade ended without silverware following a 2-22 to 0-25 defeat by Tipperary on 3 June 2009.

Senior

O'Sullivan made his first appearance for the Cork senior hurling team on 18 February 2007 in a 1-21 to 0-14 National Hurling League defeat of Offaly. On 11 May, a scan revealed that O'Sullivan had ruptured a cruciate ligament and was ruled out for the rest of the season.

O'Sullivan returned to the Cork senior panel during the 2008 National League before making his first Munster Championship appearance on 8 June 2008 in a 1-19 to 1-13 defeat by Tipperary.

Two months before Cork's opening championship game in 2013, O'Sullivan suffered a serious leg break in a club match which ruled him out for the rest of the season. After a fourteen-month lay-off O'Sullivan returned to inter-county action. He was introduced as a second half substitute and scored a point inside ten seconds in Cork's 0-28 to 0-14 Munster quarter-final replay defeat of Waterford. O'Sullivan later made a similar cameo appearance during the provincial decider. A personal tally of 1-1, together with a goal from Séamus Harnedy, gave Cork a 2-24 to 0-24 victory over Limerick. It was O'Sullivan's first Munster medal.

Munster

O'Sullivan also had the honour of being picked for Munster in the inter-provincial series of games. He won an Interprovincial Championship medal in 2013 as Munster defeated Connacht by 1-22 to 0-15.

Career statistics

Club

Division

Inter-county

Inter-provincial

Honours

Midleton CBS
Dr Harty Cup (1): 2006

Cloyne
Cork Junior Football Championship (1): 2010
 East Cork Junior A Football Championship (3): 2008, 2009, 2010

Imokilly
Cork Senior Hurling Championship (3): 2017, 2018, 2019

Cork
Munster Senior Hurling Championship (1): 2014
Munster Minor Hurling Championship (2): 2005, 2006

Munster
Inter-provincial Championship (1): 2013

References

External links
Paudie O'Sullivan profile at the Cork GAA website

1988 births
Living people
Cloyne hurlers
Cloyne Gaelic footballers
Cork inter-county hurlers
Dual players
Irish electricians
Munster inter-provincial hurlers
People educated at Midleton CBS Secondary School